Strathgartney Provincial Park is a provincial park in Prince Edward Island, Canada. Its trails connect it to Bonshaw Provincial Park. In June 2021, it was announced that a portion of the parked will be leased privately and turned into luxury campgrounds.

References

Provincial parks of Prince Edward Island
Parks in Queens County, Prince Edward Island